Snake Eyes: Deadgame is an American comic book limited series by Rob Liefeld and Chad Bowers, and debuted on July 15, 2020 by IDW Publishing. The series features several characters from the G.I. Joe franchise by Donald Levine and Hasbro, but focuses on Snake Eyes as the main character.

The series debuted on July 15, 2020 and concluded on July 7, 2021.

Premise 
Snake Eyes faces an enemy that wants to expose his secret past, which endangers his time of service on G.I. Joe.

Production history

Background 
In 2018, IDW Publishing announced most of the G.I. Joe comics would be rebooted following the cancellation of Scarlett's Strike Force and the conclusion of the Hasbro Comic Book Universe. Therefore, while G.I. Joe: A Real American Hero by Larry Hama continues its run, a newly rebooted G.I. Joe series by Paul Allor and Chris Evenhuis started being published in September 2019.

Development 
Snake Eyes: Deadgame was announced in July 2019, and will be written by Rob Liefeld and Chad Bowers and dawn by Liefeld. He considered Snake Eyes as both an icon and "bucket list" for him, stating the character is "Wolverine, Deadpool and Spider-Man rolled into one amazing character for an entire generation of fans that thrilled to his adventures in comics and cartoons and hung on his every toy release! My parents drove me all over the county to get me G.I. Joe action figures as a kid. These were my first and most favorite toys. Working with Hasbro and all my friends at IDW has been a blast so far. I can’t wait to get this work out into the public! If you enjoyed my recent Marvel work, this will match or exceed it!"

He also added that "G.I. Joe was my first obsession. Those were the toys in the sandbox with me, kung fu grip, eagle eye, I had them all. G.I. Joe is a world of characters that I have always aspired to participate in. Snake Eyes was a profound influence on me creating Deadpool. Producing this series is an all time bucket list achievement for me.”

IDW Editor-In-Chief John Barber said “I’ve seen Rob’s excitement about G.I. Joe for years. “I’m thrilled and amazed to see it all finally coming together in the biggest Snake Eyes comic book in decades — maybe ever! There’s a real electric charge in the air every day as new pages come in — every one seemingly topping the last!”

A special one-shot issue titled Snake Eyes: Deadgame — Declassified was released on December 1, 2021.

Issues

Reception

Collected edition

References

Notes

Footnotes

External links 
 IDW Publishing's official announcement

IDW Publishing titles
G.I. Joe comics